Power Rangers Dino Thunder is the twelfth season of the television series, Power Rangers.
This incarnation of Power Rangers was adapted from Bakuryū Sentai Abaranger, the 27th entry of Toei Company's long-running Super Sentai franchise. Dino Thunder was also the subtitle of the Korean dub of Abaranger in South Korea and had a similar/identical logo to the American version as well.
The series is notable as it features the return of Jason David Frank as Tommy Oliver and a dinosaur theme for the powers, abilities and assets of most of the series' protagonists and antagonists. It was the first series to be aired on ABC Family part of ABC.

Plot
A soccer player, a computer expert, a singer and then eventually both an artist and a teacher with a long history of such situations become Power Rangers to help save Earth from the ruthless scheming of the dinosauric Mesogog who wishes to eradicate all human life and return Earth to the age of dinosaurs. Mesogog is assisted in his ways by Elsa, Zeltrax, and an army each of both Tyrannodrones and Triptoids as well as monsters that they call their Mutations.

In this season, Tommy Oliver, from Mighty Morphin Power Rangers (starting from part 1 of season 1's 5-part story, 'Green With Evil') to Power Rangers Turbo (Tommy's last appearance in the franchise onwards would be in the final scene of part 2 of Turbos two-part story 'Passing the Torch' (episodes 18 to 19)) fame with a guest appearance in Wild Forces Red Ranger team-up special 'Forever Red', returns as a paleontology professor in Reefside, California and so he is known as Dr. Tommy Oliver (sometimes named by some in short as Dr. O). When he is assigned three detention students by Principle Randall (the human disguise of Elsa): athlete Conner McKnight, computer expert Ethan James and singer Kira Ford. They end up finding three Dino Gems - one for each teen, paving the way for their destiny as Dino Rangers. Conner gains the powers of both the Tyrannozord and super running speed, Ethan gains the powers of both the Tricerazord and energy-formed skin-shield defense and Kira gains the powers of both the Pterazord and sonic screams.

Five episodes into the series, Tommy once again becomes a Power Ranger by bonding with the Black Dino Gem (and receiving its power of invisibility - the first of two Dino Gem powers related to stealth) and therefore becoming the Black Dino Ranger (and ultimately becoming the first Power Ranger in history to also bear the role of the mentor of a new team of Rangers) and they are also later joined by Anton Mercer's adopted son Trent (some media reveals his family name, after 'Mercer', to be 'Fernandez' - 'Fernandez-Mercer') as the White Dino Ranger, whose White Dino Gem grants him the power of camouflage (another Dino Gem power related to stealth) - before he joins, he must deal with the inner struggle of good and evil (as Tommy himself once had to do as the evil Green Ranger) because he gained his powers from a raw Dino Gem in Mesogog's lab, with the powers originally intended to be Mesogog's. Mesogog is, in fact, Trent's adopted father, who, in a faulty lab experiment, began to mutate into Mesogog. Trent later sides with good and saves his father from the mutation.

The Dino Rangers morph by drawing power from their respective Dino Gems, which Tommy grants Conner's, Ethan's and Kira's the ability to morph into Dino Morphers whenever needed (Morph call: "Dino Thunder, Power Up!"). They use their abilities to battle the villain Mesogog. By calling out "Super Dino Mode", the Power Rangers tap into the power of the dinosaurs, with spikes extending into view on their suits and, in the case of Kira, wings with Trent's own Super Dino Mode possessing an exclusive extra factor: bladed thin spikes extending from his hands. Each Dino Gems has a special power; red is speed; blue is armor; yellow is hyper screeching; black and white are similar, being invisibility and camouflage, which means Tommy and Trent both use stealth-themed powers with their Gems. In Power Rangers Dino Fury, the Dino Gems are revealed to be created by Morphin Masters.

During the course of the series, the team adds the following to its arsenal of Zords: Cephalozord (based on the Pachycephalosaurus), Dimetrozord (based on the Dimetrodon), Stegozord (based on the Stegosaurus), Parasaurzord (based on the Parasaurolophus), and Ankylozord (based on the Ankylosaurus). The Stegozord later combines with Trent's Dragozord (based on the Tupuxuara) to form the Dino Stegozord, effectively stealing the Stegozord. Tommy is paired with the Brachiozord (based on the Brachiosaurus), a carrier Zord for most, but not all, of the other Zords. Conner is also later given the powers of the Shield of Triumph to morph into the Triassic Ranger for extra power and pilots the Mezodon Rover/Megazord (based on the Styracosaurus), the Zord that corresponds with the Triassic Ranger powers, which can combine with the Cephalo, Dimetro, Parasaur and Ankylozords to form the Triceramax Megazord.

At the end of the series, the Rangers destroy Mesogog with their raw Dino Gem powers combined into a single last-resort attack which burns out the gems in the process beyond any possibility of the powers restoring at all (Just before this final battle, they are forced to sacrifice the Zords in their last battle with Zeltrax). Finally they return to their normal lives.

Cast and characters
Dino Thunder Rangers
 James Napier as Conner McKnight, the Red Dino Ranger and Triassic Ranger.
 Kevin Duhaney as Ethan James, the Blue Dino Ranger.
 Emma Lahana as Kira Ford, the Yellow Dino Ranger.
 Jason David Frank as Dr. Tommy Oliver, the Black Dino Ranger.
 Jeffrey Parazzo as Trent Fernandez, the White Dino Ranger.

Supporting characters
 Ismay Johnston as Hayley Ziktor.
 Katrina Devine as Cassidy Cornell.
 Tom Hern as Devin Del Valle.
 Latham Gaines as Dr. Anton Mercer.

Villains
 Latham Gaines as Mesogog.
 Miriama Smith as Elsa/Principal Randall.
 James Gaylyn as the voice of Zeltrax.
 Adam Gardiner as the voice of White Dino Ranger Clone.

Guest stars
 Pua Magasiva as Shane Clarke, the Red Wind Ranger.
 Sally Martin as Tori Hanson, the Blue Wind Ranger.
 Glenn McMillan as Waldo "Dustin" Brooks, the Yellow Wind Ranger.
 Adam Tuominen as Hunter Bradley, the Crimson Thunder Ranger.
 Jorgito Vargas, Jr. as Blake Bradley, the Navy Thunder Ranger.
 Jason Chan as Cameron "Cam" Watanabe, the Green Samurai Ranger.
 Grant McFarland as Sensei Kanoi Watanabe and Lothor.
 Peter Rowley as the voice of Zurgane.
 Katrina Browne as Kapri.

Episodes

Production

Due to the mention that Power Rangers solely existed as a comic book in Power Rangers Ninja Storm, many fans believed that series existed in a different universe than that of the original Power Rangers series. (However, Power Rangers in Space had previously mentioned a Ranger-based comic book in its crossover with Ninja Turtles: The Next Mutation). Fans also believed this due to the lack of a Ninja Storm/Wild Force team-up episode, partly due to the actors refusing to come since much of the production crew had been laid off as well as the change in hands of the Power Rangers franchise from Saban to Disney and filming locations from United States to New Zealand. Executive producer Douglas Sloan also received heavy criticism for not tying Ninja Storm in with the original universe.

To tie up all of the loose Ninja Storm ends, and to try to bring in a larger audience, Sloan brought back Jason David Frank and his original character, the once evil turned hero, green, white, red, and now black ranger from Mighty Morphin Power Rangers through Power Rangers Turbo, Tommy Oliver, a legendary Power Ranger, as a mentor for the new team as well as a fellow Power Ranger. Jason Frank has said that he did the show as a favor for Sloan. Through the episodes "Legacy of Power" (the 500th episode overall), a look back on all of the previous Power Rangers series; "Back in Black", giving Tommy new Power Ranger powers; "Fighting Spirit", seeing Tommy encounter his previous Ranger forms and airing on the eleventh anniversary of Power Rangers no less; and "Thunder Storm", a team-up arc between Dino Thunder and Ninja Storm, all previous series were included in the original Power Rangers universe.

Also in the season premiere "Day of the Dino", Mesogog knew of Lothor as he mentioned Reefside would believe he had returned to town, although Blue Bay Harbor was Lothor's target in Ninja Storm.

Dino Thunder also was the first Power Rangers series to overtly acknowledge its Super Sentai roots with an episode entitled "Lost and Found in Translation," which featured a Japanese show based on the Power Rangers dubbed in English. In actuality, the footage used in that episode was from episode 10 ("Abare League Bind") of Dino Thunder'''s source series, Bakuryū Sentai Abaranger, dubbed in a manner similar to the comedic parody dub of Kagaku Sentai Dynaman in the late 1980s.

Video games
There were two games produced for Dino Thunder. On the Game Boy Advance, there was a sidescrolling game, which was a platformer involving fighting several villains from the series. The other game was produced for the PlayStation 2 and the GameCube. This was the first Power Rangers game produced on a sixth generation console. All the action takes place inside the zords. This game also had some inconsistencies with the television series to allow the action to take place in the zords while battling the regular enemies who were human size.

Home Media
In the United States, the series was released by Buena Vista Home Entertainment on five volumes, consisting of the first twenty-four episodes, except for Episode 10:
 Day of the Dino (June 1, 2004, episodes 1-3, also includes Episodes 37-38 of Ninja Storm)
 Legacy of Power (September 7, 2004, episodes 4-8)
 White Thunder (September 7, 2004, episodes 9, 11-14)
 Collision Course (December 7, 2004, episodes 15-19)
 Triassic Triumph (December 7, 2004, episodes 20-24)

These volume sets were also released in regions where BVHE held distribution rights, however, Volume 1 does not include the bonus Ninja Storm'' episodes. In countries where licensing was held by Jetix Europe, releases depended on the region or distributor.

BVHE released the complete series in the United Kingdom on July 14, 2008, on a seven-disc boxset. In the United States, Shout! Factory released the complete series on a five-disc set on October 18, 2016 in the United States.

Notes

References

External links

 Official Power Rangers Website
 

 
2000s American high school television series
2000s American science fiction television series
2004 American television series debuts
2004 American television series endings
ABC Family original programming
American Broadcasting Company original programming
American children's action television series
American children's adventure television series
American children's fantasy television series
English-language television shows
Dino Thunder
Science fantasy television series
Television series about dinosaurs
Television series about size change
Television series by Disney
Television shows adapted into video games
Television shows filmed in New Zealand
Television shows set in California